Graziano Santucci, O.S.A. (died 1517) was a Roman Catholic prelate who served as Bishop of Alatri (1516–1517).

Biography
Graziano Santucci was ordained a priest in the Order of Saint Augustine.
On 11 Nov 1516, he was appointed during the papacy of Pope Leo X as Bishop of Alatri.
He served as Bishop of Alatri until his death in 1517.

References

External links and additional sources
 (for Chronology of Bishops) 
 (for Chronology of Bishops)  

16th-century Italian Roman Catholic bishops
Bishops appointed by Pope Leo X
1517 deaths
Augustinian bishops